Telecommunications and Post Regulatory Authority (TPRA) is a government agency founded under the Telecommunications and Post Regulating Act, 2018. Telecommunications and Post Regulatory Authority is responsible for regulating all matters related to telecommunications (wire, cellular, satellite and cable), postal services of Sudan.

See also 

 List of telecommunications regulatory bodies

References

External links 

 

Communications authorities
Telecommunications regulatory authorities
Government agencies of Sudan